Waterloo Rovers Football Club is a Welsh football club based in Welshpool, Powys. They currently playing in the Central Wales League Northern Division.

The home colours are blue shirts with black shorts and socks.

Waterloo Rovers were founded after the war by Welshpool brothers Bert and Tom James, playing on the old tip, before later folding and joining with Guilsfield. After a few years joined with Guilsfield, Waterloo Rovers regained independence, and began playing on a pitch by Maesydre, and Welshpool Rugby Club's pitch, where they have played ever since.
In 1978 Bert and Tom's younger brother, Fred James, became the first President of Waterloo Rovers F.C.

Honours

Central Wales Challenge Cup – Winners: 2009–10

References 

 

Football clubs in Wales
Mid Wales Football League clubs
Montgomeryshire Football League clubs
Sport in Powys